Life Insurance 2 (Heart Muzik) is the sixth studio album released by rapper Mr. Serv-On, on May 27, 2008. It is the sequel to his 1997 album, Life Insurance.

Track listing

 Intro
 Stacks Up
 HustlaMuzik
 Ahhh
 Please Me (Ft. Andreus)
 Commercial
 Crazy (Ft. Izzy White)
 Lets Lie
 Hood Made Me (Ft. Calicoc Da Champ, & KLC)
 Thug Exercise
 Dream (Ft. Lisa G)
 Shine (Ft. Southern Keys)
 I'm A Champ
 Play It Out
 Who Am I
 Be Me
 Rap Star
 Got To Get Back
 Ghetto Cry
 Ballard Of My Struggle (Ft. Izzy White)
 Blood In, Blood Out (Hidden Bonus Track)

References

External links
http://www.discogs.com/Mr-Serv-On-Life-Insurance-2-Heart-Muzik/release/3958337

2008 albums
Mr. Serv-On albums
Sequel albums